Watford Football Club (also known simply as Watford, or as The Hornets) is an English association football club from the town of Watford, in Hertfordshire. The 2010–11 English football season officially began on 1 July 2010, and ended on 30 June 2011, although Watford only played competitive fixtures between August and May. The team competed in the Football League Championship for the fourth consecutive season, following relegation from the Premier League in 2006–07. The club chairman was Graham Taylor, who as a manager took Watford from the Fourth Division to the top division of English football. Their manager was Malky Mackay, and their captain was central midfielder John Eustace.

Background

Watford sold several key players at the start of 2009–10, including 2008–09 Watford F.C. Player of the Season Tommy Smith, highest earner Jobi McAnuff and Hungary international striker Tamás Priskin. The team did well in their opening game, and were briefly in contention for a playoff position early in the season, but a series of postponements, poor away form and a run of one win in twelve games took Watford to within a point of relegation by April. A 3–0 home win in the penultimate game against Reading secured survival, and a 4–0 win at Coventry City on the last day of the season elevated Watford to a final position of 16th, as well as ending the team's six-month wait for an away win.

As part of financial restructuring at the club, a number of players on higher wages whose contracts expired in June 2010 were allowed to leave the club on free transfers. These included captain and USA international Jay DeMerit, former Chelsea player Jon Harley and ex-Rotherham United striker Will Hoskins. Young goalkeeper Jonathan North and winger Billy Gibson were both also released. Manager Malky Mackay did, however, decide to retain the services of Liam Henderson and Dale Bennett after the duo triggered one-year extension options in their contracts.

Pre-season

Watford began pre-season training on 1 July 2010, the same day that Tom Aldred and Rene Gilmartin officially became Watford players. The team's first friendly match was a 5–0 away win at local side Boreham Wood, in which Will Buckley scored a hat-trick. The club played several further away fixtures against local, lower division sides in July. Their only defeat in these fixtures was a 1–0 loss to Barnet at Underhill Stadium. Their final friendly game—the only pre-season match at Vicarage Road—was a 1–0 win against League One team Charlton Athletic, with Danny Graham scoring the only goal of the game. Graham was Watford's top scorer in pre-season fixtures, with four goals. Buckley and Stephen McGinn scored three goals each, Marvin Sordell scored two, and John Eustace scored one. Striker Troy Deeney joined Watford in the week after the Charlton match.

Legend

Football League Championship

A total of 24 teams competed in the Football League Championship in the 2010–11 season. Each team played 46 matches; two against every other team, with one match played at each club's stadium. Three points were awarded for each win, one for a draw, and none for defeats. The provisional fixture list was released on 17 June 2010, but was subject to change in the event of clashes with other competitions, inclement weather, extraordinary circumstances, or matches being selected for television coverage. For instance, Watford's opening match of the season at Norwich City was moved from 7 to 6 August, thus becoming the first game of the 2010–11 Football League.

August
In the televised opening game of the season, away to Norwich City, Watford captain John Eustace scored the first goal of the 2010–11 Football League, after 14 minutes of play. Striker Danny Graham doubled Watford's lead before half time. Norwich pulled a goal back shortly after the interval, before Graham restored Watford's two-goal cushion in the 82nd minute. Norwich defender Michael Nelson halved Watford's lead in injury time, but the Hornets held on to win 3–2. The team's next league fixture was a home match against Coventry City, managed by former Watford boss Aidy Boothroyd. For the second match in succession, Watford took the lead, with winger Will Buckley opening the scoring just before half time. Former Coventry player Eustace scored Watford's second; an overhead volley that was later voted Goal of the Season by Watford fans. Watford led going into the last five minutes of the game, but Coventry secured a draw with late goals from David Bell and Lukas Jutkiewicz.

The Hornets extended their unbeaten start to the season a week later. Their 0–0 draw at Hull City marked Watford's first clean sheet of 2010–11, but also the first time that the team had failed to score. Their unbeaten run ended in their final game of the month, at home to newly promoted Leeds United. Leeds captain Richard Naylor scored the only goal of the game in the 6th minute, while Troy Deeney made his first start for Watford in the absence of Graham.

September
After a two-week break for international matches, Watford hosted Doncaster Rovers on 11 September. Watford trailed 1–0 at half time, before taking a 2–1 lead with a brace from Marvin Sordell. Although behind after 90 minutes, Doncaster salvaged a draw with an injury time equaliser from George Friend. Sordell scored an early goal three days later at Bristol City. Graham doubled Watford's advantage shortly after half time, to give his team a second league win of the season.

The team's next opponents were Millwall, a side managed by ex-Watford player and manager Kenny Jackett.
The Hornets thrashed their opponents 6–1. Central defenders Adrian Mariappa and Martin Taylor and loanee Jordon Mutch scored their first goals of the season, while Graham, Sordell and Eustace also scored for Watford. This result took Watford into the playoff places, and was later voted by supporters as the Team Performance of the Season.

Watford's wait for a first home league win of the campaign ended on 25 September, against Middlesbrough. Graham scored the opening goal after 17 seconds, and Watford were 3–0 up after 20 minutes. Middlesbrough scored a late consolation through an own goal from Mariappa, to make the final score 3–1. In the last game of the month, Watford hosted Swansea City, managed by Malky Mackay's predecessor, Brendan Rodgers. In contrast to the previous game, Watford trailed 2–0 at half time, and 3–0 after 70 minutes. Goals from substitute Troy Deeney and Martin Taylor reduced Watford's deficit to one goal, but Rodgers' side held on to win 3–2. Despite the defeat, Watford finished the month in a playoff position.

October
Watford started October with a 1–0 away win at Sheffield United, with Sordell scoring the game's only goal. After a two-week gap in the fixture list for international matches, the Hornets travelled to Portsmouth. Watford trailed 1–0 at half time, to a goal from Hayden Mullins. They equalised through Martin Taylor after 67 minutes, and Stephen McGinn's first league goal of the season three minutes later gave Watford the lead. However, Portsmouth equalised shortly afterwards, and Michael Brown scored Portsmouth's winner in the 80th minute. McGinn doubled his league tally three days later, opening the scoring at home to Ipswich Town, before Sordell doubled Watford's advantage. Ipswich improved in the second half, following the introduction of substitute Connor Wickham. After conceding in the 69th minute, Watford held on for a 2–1 win.

The team's next opponents were Scunthorpe United, who along with Watford had been tipped for relegation in 2010–11. Scunthorpe started strongly. They took the lead on 28 minutes, doubling their advantage shortly before half time. Watford improved after the break, but were unable to prevent a 2–0 defeat. Watford's final match of October was a trip to Pride Park, to face Derby County. In front of 27,119 spectators, the home side took a two-goal lead in the first half. Matthew Whichelow's first senior goal reduced Watford's deficit, but goals from Tomasz Cywka and Shefki Kuqi consigned Watford to a 4–1 defeat, which took them out of the playoff places.

November
After defeat at Derby County, Watford hosted Derby's rivals, Nottingham Forest. Mutch scored the opening goal with a header after three minutes, before Lewis McGugan equalised midway through the first half. Both teams created goal scoring opportunities in the second half, but the match finished 1–1.

Watford's next two games were away from home, to Crystal Palace and Burnley. The two matches followed a very similar pattern. In each match, the home side scored the opening goal in the first half. Watford were able to take 2–1 leads shortly into the second halves, but on each occasion the home side came back to win 3–2. Mackay expressed frustration at his side's inability to score goals against Palace, after creating nine chances in the first half. He was critical of the referee's decision to award Burnley a penalty, but made clear that there is "no room for hard luck stories" in football.

Results

Summary

Key

H: Home fixture

A: Away fixture

Correct .

League table

FA Cup

The FA Cup is an annual knockout competition. It began in August with two preliminary rounds, followed by four qualifying rounds. The successful qualifiers progressed to the First Round, when teams from League One and League Two entered the competition. Watford, along with other Premier League and Championship clubs, entered at the Third Round stage. They were joined by the 20 winners from the Second Round for a total of 64 clubs in the Third Round draw.

The Third Round draw took place on 28 November 2010. It saw Watford drawn at home to the winners of the Second Round tie between League One teams Hartlepool United and Yeovil Town; Hartlepool eventually progressed. Watford designated the game as the club's "Marie Curie Match", in support of Marie Curie Cancer Care. In an English league football first, the club pledged to donate its share of the ticket sale profits to the charity, and launched a separate online fundraiser for fans who wanted to support the charity but couldn't attend the fixture, as well as those who wished to make an additional donation.

Football League Cup

The draw for the first round of the Football League Cup took place on 16 June 2010, and saw Watford drawn away to League Two side Aldershot Town. Coincidentally, the two sides were due to play one another at Aldershot's stadium in a pre-season match at the end of July; that fixture was cancelled by mutual agreement following the draw. The ten outfield players that started Watford's opening match against Norwich kept their places in the starting line-up, while Rene Gilmartin kept a clean sheet on his competitive Watford debut. A brace from Danny Graham and a first goal of the season from Marvin Sordell gave Watford a 3–0 victory.

In the second round, the Hornets faced League One outfit Notts County at Vicarage Road. Watford made five changes from the team that started in the 0–0 draw against Hull City; Hodson, Taylor, Eustace, Graham and Loach were rested. Among the replacements were Troy Deeney, who made his first start for Watford, and academy scholar Adam Thompson, who was playing his first ever game of senior football. After a goalless first half, Notts County took a 2–0 lead. Deeney scored to reduce their lead to 2–1, but Watford were unable to score an equaliser. Ex-Watford player Jon Harley came on as a late substitute for Notts County, and was applauded by fans of his former club.

Players

Statistics

No. = Squad number

Pos = Playing position

P = Number of games played

G = Number of goals scored

 = Yellow cards

GK = Goalkeeper

DF = Defender

MF = Midfielder

FW = Forward

 = Red cards

Yth = Whether player went through Watford's youth system

Club career = Period that player spent as a Watford first team player

Age = Age of player on final day of season (7 May 2011)

Club career lengths correct . Only players that were named in at least one matchday squad are listed.

Transfers
Unless a country is specified, all clubs play in the English football league system.

In

Out

Loans

In

Out

Management and coaching staff

Reserves and academy
Watford's reserve side compete in the Totesport.com Combination East Division, which they won in 2009–10. They play their home games at Meadow Park, home of Conference South side Borehamwood. They also played in the Herts Senior Cup, where they went out to Stevenage.

Watford's academy consists of 22 scholars:
 In the second year, goalkeepers Jonathan Bond and Jamie Irving, defenders Oliver Archer, Adam Fenwick, Faisal Hemati and Adam Thompson, midfielders Greg Deer, Chez Isaac and Britt Assombalonga and strikers Gavin Massey and Jake Rosier.
 In the first year, goalkeeper Jack Bonham, defenders Chimdi Akubuine, Matt Bevans, Tommie Hoban, Brandon Horner and Aaron Tumwa, midfielders Stephan Hamilton Forbes and Sean Murray, and strikers Dereece Gardner, Michael Kalu and Connor Smith.
Schoolboys Mohamed Bettamer, Kamaron English and Bernard Mensah also played for the academy side, along with trialist Peter Grant. Hoban, Massey, Murray and Thompson have made first-team appearances in 2010–11, while Assombalonga, Bond, Isaac and Smith have been unused substitutes.

Massey, Murray and Bond signed professional contracts during the 2010 pre-season, with Murray signing his alongside his scholarship forms. Bonham and Thompson signed contracts in September and November respectively. In April Watford announced the fates of the remaining second year scholars; Assombalonga and Isaac were given professional contracts and Archer, Deer, Fenwick, Hemati, Irving and Rosier were released.

The under-18s play their home games at Watford's training base at the UCL training ground, London Colney. They are members of the FA Premier Academy League. They also played in the FA Youth Cup, where they defeated Swindon Town (at home), Wigan Athletic (at home) and Fulham (away), before losing to Chelsea 2–1 at Stamford Bridge in the quarter-finals. Watford also sent an under-15 side to the 2010 Milk Cup in Northern Ireland, where they finished seventh.

Ownership and finance

Watford Football Club is owned by the holding company Watford Leisure Plc (LSE: WFC). The holding company's 2009–10 financial year ran from 1 July 2009 until 30 June 2010. It released its audited accounts and annual report on 31 October 2010, which included details of the club's major shareholders. At the time of the report Fordwat Limited, the investment company of Michael Ashcroft, owned 37.16% of Watford Leisure. Valley Grown Salads (VGS), owned by former Watford Leisure directors Jimmy and Vince Russo, held a 29.98% stake. Previous Watford chairman Graham Simpson had a 16.79% share. No other individual or organisation held more than 3% of the company's shares.

As 2009–10 was the club's third consecutive season in the Championship, it stopped receiving parachute payments from the Premier League. Consequently, money received from the Premier League fell from £12,298,000 in 2008–09 to £993,000 in 2009–10. This was the primary contributor in Watford Leisure's total revenue dropping by 51.2% from £23.049 million to £11.258 million. A reduction in salary costs of £4.121 million and a profit of £4.111 million on player trading helped to mitigate the reduction in revenue. Nonetheless, the company's loss before taxation was £4.063 million, up from a loss of £1.987 million in the previous financial year.

In December 2010, the Board of Directors announced to the stock exchange that discussions were underway between Ashcroft and a potential buyer of his shares, but stressed that these discussions were at an early stage. If a buyer were to acquire over 30% of Watford Leisure's shares, they would be required by stock exchange rules to make an offer for all remaining shares.

A takeover offer for Watford Leisure plc was initiated on 10 March 2011, by newly formed holding company Watford FC Limited, owned by Laurence Bassini.

Footnotes

References

External links
Watford Football Club official site
The Football League official site

Watford
Watford F.C. seasons